Josué Yayra Doké (born 20 April 2004) is a Togolese footballer who currently plays as a forward for Ghana Premier League side WAFA.

Career 
Doké started his career with West African Football Academy in 2019–20.

International career 
In October 2020, Doké was handed his maiden call up into the Togo national team by Claude Le Roy at the age of 16 years. He made his debut on 12 October 2020, after coming on in the 79th minute for Gilles Sunu in a friendly match against Sudan. The match ended in a 1–1 draw.

Career statistics

International

References

External links 
 
 
 
 
 

Living people
2004 births
Association football forwards
Togolese footballers
West African Football Academy players
Togolese expatriate footballers
Togolese expatriate sportspeople in Ghana
Togo international footballers
21st-century Togolese people